Transgender rights in the Federal Republic of Germany are regulated by the  ("Transsexual law") since 1980, and indirectly affected by other laws like the  ("Law of Descent"). The law initially required transgender people to undergo gender-affirming surgery in order to have key identity documents changed. This has since been declared unconstitutional. The German government has pledged to replace the Transsexuellengesetz with the Selbstbestimmungsgesetz, which would remove the financial and bureaucratic hurdles necessary for legal gender and name changes. Discrimination protections on the basis of gender identity and sexual orientation vary across Germany, but discrimination in employment and the provision of goods and services is in principle banned countrywide.

The 

In 1980, West Germany passed a law regulating the change of first names and legal gender, the "Gesetz über die Änderung der Vornamen und die Feststellung der Geschlechtszugehörigkeit in besonderen Fällen, (:de:Transsexuellengesetz – TSG) or, "Law concerning the change of first name and determination of gender identity in special cases (Transsexual law – TSG)". Since 1990, following the reunification of East and West Germany, it applies to all of Germany. 

To change either name or gender, two independent medical court experts have to be commissioned by the judge. They are asked to evaluate, whether
 the person "does not identify with the birth-assigned sex/gender, but with the other one", and
 "feels a compulsion to live according to his/her ideas for at least three years", and
 it is to be assumed with high probability, that the feeling of belonging to the other sex/gender is not going to change".

Name changes 
One can either obtain a change of name alone, and proceed later with a change of legal gender, if possible or desired, or obtain both in a single legal procedure.

The name change becomes legally void if a child of the trans person is born more than 300 days after the name change.

Several court decisions have further specified several matters. For example, a person with only a name change has the right to be called "Herr" or "Frau" (Mr. or Ms.) according to their first name, not their legal gender; similarly, documents have to be issued reflecting their actual gender identity, not legal gender. Job references, certifications and similar from the time before the change of name may be reissued with the new name, so effectively there is no way for a new employer to learn about the change of name and/or legal gender. Also, people with only a name change do not have to divulge their legal gender to employers. 

A name change is registered as previous last names in the resident registration (German "Melderegister"). It is also registered in the Federal Central Tax Office as previous last names with the Tax Identification Number. Based on the previous last names there can be seen the previous gender.

Gender marker changes 
To change legal gender before 1980, it used to be required that the person:
 was permanently infertile, and
 has had surgery through which their outer sexual characteristics are changed to a "significant approximation" to the appearance of their preferred biological sex.
The administrative procedure for changing the legal gender under the TSG is lengthy and costly, requiring several assessments. According to a government study, the average cost for the assessments is 1,660 euros, with an additional 206 euros spent on court fees, on average. According to the LGBT rights association LSVD, some medical professionals that conduct the assessments also ask invasive questions about intimate details such as sexual fantasies, their underwear, masturbatory behaviour and other sexual practices. This contrasts with a comparatively easier process for intersex people under § 45b PStG.

Constitutional challenges 
The TSG has been found unconstitutional on a variety of grounds by the Federal Constitutional Court since its inception. In 1982, the requirement that a candidate be 25 years of age was found in violation of the equality clause of the German Constitution (Art. 3). In 2006, the court ordered lawmakers to amend the law so that the TSG would apply for non-Germans who have legal residency status in Germany, as long as their country of citizenship doesn't have equivalent laws. In 2008, the court declared that the requirement that a candidate be unmarried was unconstitutional. In January 2011, the court declared the criteria for gender change requiring gender-affirming surgery and sterilization or infertility unconstitutional.

Gender-neutral names 
In the past, German law required parents to give their child a gender-specific name. This is no longer true, since the Federal Constitutional Court of Germany held in 2008 that there is no obligation that a name has to be sex-specific, even if it is the only one.

Third gender 
This means that birth certificates no longer have blank gender entries for intersex people.

Parental identification on children's birth certificates 
While the legal gender for trans people can be changed through the TSG, they will still be forcibly misgendered as biological parents on their children's birth certificates with a reference to their old gender (e.g. a trans woman as "father"), with no option of a reissued certificate. This has been overruled in other EU countries like France, but not so far in Germany, potentially involuntarily outing transgender parents to their children's schools and to other governments when they travel, which according to TGEU is a threat to transgender people's freedom of travel.

Discrimination protections 

The Equal Treatment Act came into force on 18 August 2006. It bans discrimination based on sexual orientation, gender identity and sex characteristics in employment and the provision of goods and services.

Hate speeches on the basis of sexual orientation and gender identity are not banned nationwide in Germany. Some states have laws banning all forms of discrimination in their constitutions (Berlin, Brandenburg, Bremen, Saarland and Thuringia). In those states, hate speech based on both sexual orientation and gender identity is prohibited.

Politicians 
In September 2021, Nyke Slawik and Tessa Ganserer, members of the Green Party, were elected to the Bundestag. They are openly transgender women. Later that year, the government pledged to loosen restrictions on legal name changes and to compensate transgender people who were sterilized against their will.
:de:Michaela Lindner was one of the first out transgender politicians in Germany.

See also
 LGBT rights in Germany
 Legal status of transgender people
 Intersex rights in Germany
 Transvestite certificate (issued to trans and crossdressing people in Weimar Germany by Magnus Hirschfeld, under the aegis of the Institut für Sexualwissenschaft)
 Dora Richter (the first male-to-female trans woman recorded to receive sex reassignment surgery)

References

 
Germany
Transgender law
Germany
Transgender rights in Germany